Harleysville is a census-designated place (CDP) in Montgomery County, Pennsylvania, United States. It is a suburb of Philadelphia. The population was 9,286 at the 2010 census. It is located mostly within Lower Salford Township and also in Franconia Township. Harleysville was settled by Pennsylvania Dutch in the 18th century and was named after Samuel Harley.

History
Harleysville was settled early in Pennsylvania's history, .

The Klein Meetinghouse was listed on the National Register of Historic Places in 1973.

Geography

Pennsylvania Route 63 (Main Street) and Pennsylvania Route 113 (Harleysville Pike) meet in Harleysville and provide access to other routes on the main grid. Interstate 476 is a five-minute drive via PA 63 from Harleysville to the Lansdale Interchange, on the Northeast Extension of the Pennsylvania Turnpike.

Harleysville is in the watershed of the Perkiomen Creek (a tributary of the Schuylkill River) and is drained by the Indian Creek and Skippack Creek into the Perkiomen.

The CDP has a hot-summer humid continental climate (Dfa) and average monthly temperatures range from 30.5 °F in January to 75.2 °F in July. The hardiness zone is 6b.

Demographics

As of the 2010 census, the CDP was 90.4% Non-Hispanic White, 2.6% Black or African American, 0.1% Native American and Alaskan Native, 3.5% Asian, 0.6% were Some Other Race, and 1.2% were two or more races. 2.4% of the population were of Hispanic or Latino ancestry.

As of the census of 2000, there were 8,795 people, 3,129 households, and 2,381 families residing in the CDP. The population density was 2,111.6 people per square mile (814.3/km2). There were 3,196 housing units at an average density of 767.3/sq mi (295.9/km2). The racial makeup of the CDP was 93.89% White, 2.62% African American, 0.06% Native American, 2.24% Asian, 0.07% Pacific Islander, 0.34% from other races, and 0.78% from two or more races. Hispanic or Latino of any race were 1.81% of the population.

There were 3,129 households, out of which 41.6% had children under the age of 18 living with them, 66.6% were married couples living together, 7.1% had a female householder with no husband present, and 23.9% were non-families. 19.5% of all households were made up of individuals, and 7.6% had someone living alone who was 65 years of age or older. The average household size was 2.76 and the average family size was 3.21.

In the CDP, the population was spread out, with 28.7% under the age of 18, 6.1% from 18 to 24, 34.7% from 25 to 44, 19.6% from 45 to 64, and 10.8% who were 65 years of age or older. The median age was 35 years. For every 100 females, there were 93.9 males. For every 100 females age 18 and over, there were 89.9 males.

The median income for a household in the CDP was $66,897, and the median income for a family was $75,105. Males had a median income of $49,961 versus $33,185 for females. The per capita income for the CDP was $26,572. About 1.9% of families and 3.3% of the population were below the poverty line, including 3.7% of those under age 18 and 8.3% of those age 65 or over.

Arts and culture
Harleysville is home to a large-scale exterior mural designed by Dana McMullin, residing on the side of Rann Pharmacy, a privately owned and operated pharmacy since 1982. McMullin executed the public work with a small team in 2006 from its concept to production, portraying a visually nostalgic history of Harleysville from settlement to modern day.

Harleysville is home to an annual Heckler Fest held at the historical Heckler Plains, one of the oldest properties in the area.

Harleysville holds an annual Jaycee's Country Fair Days at the Harleysville Community Center, which many people from close by towns come to.

Harleysville also holds an annual Apple Butter Frolic to celebrate its Mennonite heritage in early fall.

It is also home to the Mennonite Heritage Center.

Education
Harleysville is part of the Souderton Area School District. The following public schools can be found in the town and surrounding communities:
Souderton Area High School
Indian Valley Middle School
Indian Crest Middle School
Oak Ridge Elementary School
Salford Hills Elementary School
Vernfield Elementary School
EMC Elementary School
West Broad Street Elementary School
Franconia Elementary School

Media
Local news for the Harleysville area is covered by the weekly Souderton Independent. The daily Reporter, a sister paper to the Independent, is also a source of community information.

News for the larger metropolitan area is covered by The Philadelphia Inquirer and the county newspaper The Times Herald.

Infrastructure

Harleysville is also served by the Lower Salford Police Department (LSPD), with the headquarters located on Main Street in the downtown area.

The closest library to Harleysville is the Indian Valley Public Library located in nearby Telford.

References

External links

 Lower Salford Township

Populated places established in 1700
Census-designated places in Montgomery County, Pennsylvania
Census-designated places in Pennsylvania
1700 establishments in Pennsylvania